Cryobacterium psychrotolerans is a Gram-positive, aerobic and psychrotolerant bacterium from the genus Cryobacterium which has been isolated from frozen soil from a glacier from the Xinjiang Uygur Autonomous Region in China.

References

Microbacteriaceae
Bacteria described in 2007